Giuseppe Borsato (14 February 1771 in Venice – 15 October 1849 in Venice) was an Italian painter, primarily of vedute. Known for his work as the architect, decorator, and painter to the French Imperial Court in Venice.

Life and works
From 1791 to 1792, he studied with Agostino Mengozzi-Colonna at the Accademia di Belle Arti.

He painted interiors of churches, sometimes in the manner of Canaletto, but was also influenced by his contemporary, Vincenzo Chilone. Among his best known decorative works are those at St Mark's Basilica and Santa Maria Gloriosa dei Frari. In 1807, he and his student, Francesco Bagnara, decorated the Teatro La Fenice. He also painted frescoes in the Palazzo Zabarella during its renovation in 1818,  alongside Francesco Hayez and Giovanni Carlo Bevilacqua.

In 1815, his paintings were used in a popular guide to the artworks of Venice, written by Giannantonio Moschini. In 1831, his lectures at the Accademia di Belle Arti were published by the Accademia as Opere Ornamentale.

Sources

Brief biography from the Dizionario Biografico @ Treccani

References

External links

18th-century Italian painters
Italian male painters
19th-century Italian painters
Painters from Venice
Academic staff of the Accademia di Belle Arti di Venezia
1771 births
1849 deaths
19th-century Italian male artists
18th-century Italian male artists